Thomas Mathews (1742–February 20, 1812) was an American Revolutionary War general and Virginia lawyer and politician. For almost two decades (with minor interruptions), Mathews represented variously Norfolk Borough and Norfolk County in the Virginia House of Delegates, and served as that body's Speaker from 1782 until 1793. He also represented Norfolk at the Virginia Ratifying Convention of 1788.

Early and family life
Thomas Mathews was born c. 1742 on Saint Kitts, an island of the West Indies. His father was Samuel Mathews. Mathews emigrated to Virginia in 1764.

In 1773 he married Molly Miller, daughter of Captain Matthias and Ann (Eady) Miller of Norfolk County.

Military career

In 1775 Mathews became Lieutenant of the Norfolk County militia, then accepted a commission as captain in 1776 and command of Fort Nelson, which protected Portsmouth, Virginia and the nearby Gosport naval yard, which was very important following the departure of Lord Dunmore from the capital at Williamsburg to British ships in the Hampton Roads area of Chesapeake Bay.

In 1777, Mathews was assigned to the artillery regiment of Col. Thomas Marshall, with the rank of major. He was in command when British General Edward Mathew landed at Port Norfolk in 1779. He received a promotion to lieutenant colonel on November 8, 1779, and another to brigadier general before the Battle of Yorktown. Mathews later became an active member of the Society of the Cincinnati.

Political career

Norfolk County voters first elected Mathews as one of their representatives to the Virginia House of Delegates in 1781, and re-elected him and his fellow delegate Thomas Newton once, before Mathews' first brief gap in his part-time legislative service, in 1783. Beginning in May 1784, Mathews represented Norfolk Borough for several years, before reverting again to Norfolk County in 1797. Fellow members elected him Speaker. Mathews became the first speaker in the present Capitol building in Richmond, remaining as such through the 1793 legislation.

An eminent member of the Norfolk Bar, Mathews also represented Norfolk at the Virginia Ratifying Convention of 1788, which ratified the federal Constitution.

A candidate for the governor of Virginia, Mathews withdrew his nomination.
He was a mason, and in 1790 was elected Grand Master of the Grand Lodge of Virginia. He served as grand master until 1793, at which point the office was passed to John Marshall.

Death and legacy

Mathews died in Norfolk borough on February 20, 1812 and was buried at St. Paul's Churchyard. A portrait of him by Mrs. William Hodges Mann Jr. hands in the courthouse in Mathews.

During his lifetimw Mathews County, Virginia was named to honor him. He has been connected to the Mathews family of Virginia by some historians, though the connection has not been made by others.

See also
Saul Matthews

References

List of former Speakers of the House of Delegates, in the old House chamber in the Virginia State Capitol

Members of the Virginia House of Delegates
Speakers of the Virginia House of Delegates
Politicians from Norfolk, Virginia
1742 births
1812 deaths
Mathews County, Virginia
People from Saint Kitts
Virginia militiamen in the American Revolution
Virginia colonial people